Jan Christoffel Greyling "Stoffel" Botha (1929–1998) was a South African politician, a member of the National Party, served as member of Parliament (elected representative of the Eshowe constituency in 1974), administrator of Natal Province (1979–1984), Minister of Home Affairs (1985–1989) in the P.W. Botha government.

Lawyer by profession, he began his professional career in Johannesburg before starting a political career.

Elected to Natal where he owned a farm, he was appointed administrator of the province in 1979. He was the provincial head of the National Party when State President P.W. Botha named him to the government in 1984 first as Minister of Education, then as Minister of Home Affairs and later the Post and Telecommunications portfolio was added to his duties.

In 1989 he announced his retirement from political life due to health reasons and despite bypass surgery he died of heart failure at age 69 in 1998.

References

1929 births
1998 deaths
Afrikaner people
National Party (South Africa) politicians
Members of the House of Assembly (South Africa)
Ministers of Home Affairs of South Africa